Ania is a genus of flowering plants from the orchid family Orchidaceae.

Species
Species accepted by the Plants of the World Online as of February 2021:

Ania angustifolia 
Ania elmeri 
Ania hongkongensis 
Ania penangiana 
Ania ruybarrettoi 
Ania viridifusca

See also
 List of Orchidaceae genera

References

 Pridgeon, A.M., Cribb, P.J., Chase, M.A. & Rasmussen, F. eds. (1999). Genera Orchidacearum Vols 1–3. Oxford Univ. Press.
 Berg Pana, H. 2005. Handbuch der Orchideen-Namen. Dictionary of Orchid Names. Dizionario dei nomi delle orchidee. Ulmer, Stuttgart

Collabieae genera
Collabieae